Imamieh is a suburb of Tabriz, Iran found in the southern part of the city. It is famous for its Imamieh cemetery (or Emamiyyeh cemetery; Farsi:قبرستان امامیه) where author Samad Behrangi has been buried.

See also
 Samad Behrangi

References 
 https://web.archive.org/web/20120226205859/http://www.eachto.ir/

External links 
 Iranian Student's Tourism & Traveling Agency, ISTTA. (English), (Persian)

Districts of Tabriz
Architecture in Iran